West Lorne Baptist Church is a Baptist church in West Lorne, Ontario, Canada. It is affiliated with Canadian Baptists of Ontario and Quebec.

History
In 1876 the Baptists met in West Lorne at first in Trigger Hall.The Hall was devoured by fire, and the church moved to Bainard Hall as the next "sanctuary" until the "First" Baptist church was built. It was dedicated on February 24, 1878. A Sunday School began in 1880.

Building history

Original building 

In 1877, Jim McCall was contracted to build the church hall. Edward Evans handcrafted the pews and pulpit. In 1908 an addition was made to the back of the building to accommodate Bible Class.

In 1921, a house was purchased and moved onto the lot north of the church building. Reconstruction finished in late 1921 or early 1922. Rev. R. J. McLaren was the first minister to live in it.

On July 31, 1921, a new baptistery was built. Norman Thompson and Mrs. Gammon were among the first to be baptized in it.

On April 21, 1946, at 3am, Mrs. Humphries awakened to discover the church on fire. Pastor Rev. J.F. Ward and the fire department were contacted. When congregants gathered at 7am for the Easter Sunrise service, they discovered the smoldering building. Arson was suspected.

Second building 
Following the fire, Isaac Lambert drew up plans for a new building. Frank Haviland donated the steel for the construction. On April 20, 1947 Rev. J. Frank Ward with Rev. D. A. Burns conducted the Re-Opening services both morning and evening.

References

Baptist churches in Canada
Buildings and structures in Elgin County
Churches in Ontario